Abil Pol Randeh (also Romanized as Ābīl Pol Randeh) is a village in Margan Rural District, in the Central District of Hirmand County, Sistan and Baluchestan Province, Iran. At the 2006 census, its population was 277, in 50 families.

References 

Populated places in Hirmand County